was a town located in Kōka District, Shiga Prefecture, Japan.

As of 2004, the town had an estimated population of 11,630 and a density of 161.89 persons per km².

On October 1, 2004, Kōka absorbed the towns of Kōnan, Minakuchi, Shigaraki and Tsuchiyama (all from Kōka District) to create the city of Kōka.

External links 

 Koka Sightseeing Guide

Dissolved municipalities of Shiga Prefecture
Kōka, Shiga